Tirumalagiri, previously spelt Trimulgherry, is a locality and a Mandal in the city of Secunderabad which falls under Secunderabad Revenue Division, and is a major suburb of Secunderabad, India. The name is an anglicization of Tirumalagiri. It is in the north of Hyderabad District.

The suburb has many smaller residential townships. Adjacent suburbs like Karkhana and AOC centre are often considered part of Trimulgherry. In the past 15 years, this suburb has become an important residential area in the twin cities. Many colonies, townships, and apartments came up in this suburb.

Closeby, a small lake known as the Hasmathpet lake supplies fresh fish to the city.

History

Historically, Secunderabad constituted a combination of three villages namely, Tirumalagiri, Bowenpally and Marredpally. It has some historic buildings built during the British era like an old British Jail and a Medical college. Sir Ronald Ross who discovered cure for Malaria worked not far from this place at Sir Ronald Ross Institute of Parasitology.

Schools

There are some good Schools and Colleges in this suburb. Notable are Delhi Public School, New Ushodaya High School (Subhash Nagar), Sherwood Public School, St Andrews School, St Josephs High School, Holy Family Girls High School, Kendriya Vidyalaya Gowtham Model School, Army School R. K. Puram.

Suburbs around Tirumalagiri
 Secunderabad City 5 km
 Begumpet Airport 6.5 km (via Tadbund)
 Karkhana 2 km
 Bowenpally Old and New  3 km
 Sikh Village 2 km
 Tadbund 3 km
 ECIL 'X' Roads 8 km
 Alwal 3.5 km
 Bolarum 6 km
 Marredpally East and West 4 km
 Sainikpuri 6 km
 Balanagar 5 km
Hospital: Tricolour Asian Hospital & Critical Care

External links
AP Transport Department

Cities and towns in Hyderabad district, India
Neighbourhoods in Hyderabad, India
Geography of Secunderabad